The fire services in Sri Lanka operate under the local governments with large Municipal Councils maintaining their own fire Brigades.

List of Fire Brigades

 Colombo Fire Brigade
 Kandy Fire Brigade
 Kotte Fire Brigade
 Gampaha Fire Brigade
 Fire and Rescue Unit - Horana
 Sri Lanka Air Force Fire and Rescue Unit
 Fire & Rescue Bandarawela
 Fire & Rescue Unit-Kalutara0342228080
 Fire & Rescue unit Kurunegala

See also
Sri Lanka Civil Security Force
Suwa Seriya Ambulance Service

References

Fire and rescue in Sri Lanka
Emergency services in Sri Lanka